ESO 444-46 (Shapley 8-1, A3558-M1) is a class E4 supergiant elliptical galaxy; the dominant and brightest member of the Abell 3558 galaxy cluster around 640 million light-years away in the constellation Centaurus. It lies within the core of the massive Shapley Supercluster, one of the closest neighboring superclusters. It is one of the largest galaxies in the local universe, and possibly contains one of the most massive black holes known. The black hole's mass is very uncertain, with estimates ranging from as low as 501 million , to as high as 77.6 billion .

Physical characteristics

As with all elliptical galaxies, ESO 444-46 is characterized by having a smooth, featureless profile in contrast to the more renounced structures of spiral galaxies such as the Milky Way. Its morphological classification, E4, suggests that it has an oval-shaped distribution of stars.

ESO 444-46 has an estimated diameter of at least 400,000 light-years, with a diffuse halo of stars extending way beyond its radius. It is more than two and a half times as large as the famous Messier 87 in the Virgo Cluster, and galaxies of its type are believed to have been the result of mergers of multiple galaxies in the past.

Features

Globular clusters

ESO 444-46 has an estimated population of about 27,000 globular clusters which may be one of the largest populations ever studied. This is in contrast to 15,000 globular clusters in Messier 87, and 200 in the Milky Way. However, this large number may be due to the addition of Intracluster globular clusters since the galaxy lies about 1 arcmin of the center of Abell 3558.

Supermassive black hole

Being the center of a massive cluster, ESO 444-46 and other similar galaxies have been proposed to contain a supermassive black hole a their centres. At least three different methods have been used to calculate the mass of the central black hole in ESO 444-46.

A calculation using the spheroidal luminosity method by estimating the stellar density of the central region using its brightness, yielded a mass of 77.6 billion solar masses (with the range being 22 billion  to 270 billion ). This would make it one of the most massive black holes known - nearly twelve times the mass of the black hole in Messier 87, and 18,000 times more massive than Sagittarius A*, the Milky Way's central black hole. A black hole of this mass has a Schwarzschild radius of 1,530 AU (about 461 billion km in diameter).

Alternative calculations using the M-sigma relation and the newer core break radius method yielded estimates of 500 million  and 27 billion , respectively.

See also 
 List of galaxies
 List of nearest galaxies
 List of NGC objects (4001–5000)
 List of spiral galaxies
 Messier 87
 NGC 4889
 NGC 4874
 IC 1101

References

External links

Centaurus (constellation)
Elliptical galaxies
444-46
047202
Shapley Supercluster